I'll Sleep When You're Dead is the second solo studio album by American hip hop artist El-P. It was released through Definitive Jux on March 20, 2007. It peaked at number 78 on the Billboard 200 chart, selling about 11,000 copies in its first week. Music videos were created for "Flyentology" and "Smithereens".

Production
Despite his usual dislike of "records that have a bunch of (featuring so and so) after every song title", El-P has explained the more organic nature of the collaborations on I'll Sleep When You're Dead:

El-P has compared the overall sound of the album's music to "a psychedelic Boogie Down Productions record", and like "Scott LaRock and Ced Gee take acid".

The bird on the album's cover is based on a drawing that Alexander Calder made on a wooden toy airplane for El-P as a child.

Critical reception

At Metacritic, which assigns a weighted average score out of 100 to reviews from mainstream critics, I'll Sleep When You're Dead received an average score of 80 based on 32 reviews, indicating "generally favorable reviews".

John Bush of AllMusic gave the album 4.5 stars out of 5, calling it "one of the most powerful hip-hop albums of 2007." Dave Heaton of PopMatters gave the album 8 stars out of 10, saying: "The genius of I'll Sleep When You're Dead -- and the reason it deserves to be considered as a progressive step in El-P's journey as an artist -- is that the tracks are just as dense and complex as on his other albums, but in a new, fresh way." Andy Battaglia of The A.V. Club gave the album a grade of B, saying, "nobody makes hip-hop as textured and atmospheric as El-P, and he manages to temper his disorienting noise with soulful suggestions this time out."

Consequence of Sound placed it at number 42 on the "Top 50 Albums of 2007" list.

Track listing

Personnel
Credits adapted from liner notes.

 El-P – vocals, production, executive production
 Omar Rodríguez-López – vocals (1)
 Cedric Bixler-Zavala – vocals (1)
 Matt Sweeney – guitar (1)
 Wilder Zoby – synthesizer (1, 7)
 Mr. Dibbs – turntables (1, 2, 7, 8)
 Hangar 18 – vocals (2)
 Mr. Lif – vocals (3)
 Big Wiz – turntables (4)
 Aesop Rock – vocals (7)
 Cage – vocals (8)
 Daniel Kaufman – lute (8)
 Mr. Len – vocals (8)
 Victoria Allen – vocals (8)
 Daryl Palumbo – vocals (9), keyboards (9)
 Camu Tao – vocals (9)
 Trent Reznor – vocals (10), additional production (10)
 Atticus Ross – programming (10)
 Rob Sonic – vocals (10)
 Tame One – vocals (11)
 Joey Raia – vocals (12), recording, mixing
 Slug – vocals (12)
 Murs – vocals (12)
 Chan "Cat Power" Marshall – vocals (13)
 Kareem Bunton – guitar (13)
 Ikey Owens – keyboards (13)
 Michael Sarsfield – mastering
 Brad Smith – layout, design
 Timothy Saccenti – photography
 Amaechi Uzoigwe – executive production
 Jesse Ferguson – project management

Charts

References

External links
 
 
 El-P's blog chronicling the album's recording process

2007 albums
Definitive Jux albums
El-P albums
Albums produced by El-P